Pontypool (stylized as POИTYPOOL) a 2008 Canadian horror film directed by Bruce McDonald and written by Tony Burgess, based on his novel Pontypool Changes Everything. A spin-off, Dreamland, was released in 2019. , a direct sequel, Pontypool Changes, has been repeatedly teased (2009 for 2010 release, 2012 for 2013 release, and 2018 for 2019 release) as supposedly being in active development over the past 13 years.

Plot
In the small town of Pontypool, Ontario, radio announcer Grant Mazzy is accosted by a nonsensical woman who repeats the word "blood" several times before staggering away.

At the radio station, Grant's shock jock style and on-air persona entertain his technical assistant, Laurel-Ann, while irritating his station manager, Sydney. Helicopter reporter Ken Loney calls in with a report about a riot at the office of Dr. Jon Mendez that has resulted in numerous deaths. After Ken is unexpectedly cut off, the group tries to confirm his report, but their witnesses are disconnected before being put on the airwaves. After they are contacted by the BBC for breaking the story, Ken calls back and says he has taken refuge in a grain silo. He describes the rioters as trying to eat one another or even themselves. When one of the rioters attacks the silo, Ken's call is interrupted by an audio transmission in French.

Laurel-Ann translates the transmission, which is an instruction to remain indoors, not to use terms of endearment, rhetorical discourse, or the English language and not to translate the message. Pontypool is declared to be under quarantine. Ken calls back again and gets his phone close enough to his attacker so that his murmurs of "Help me" in a baby-like voice are audible. A horde of people attack the radio station, and Grant, Sydney, and Laurel-Ann lock themselves inside. Meanwhile, Laurel-Ann begins repeating the word "missing" and imitates the sound of a tea kettle.

Dr. Mendez arrives at the radio station through a window and hides with Grant and Sydney in the soundproof booth. Ken calls in and, while on the air, succumbs to the virus. Laurel-Ann begins to slam her head against the sound booth's window and chews off her lower lip. Mendez hypothesizes that a virus has infected certain words in the English language; only certain words infect certain people who then find another infected person to kill themselves with. Sydney receives a call from her children, only to hear them becoming infected. Outside the booth, Laurel-Ann vomits a large amount of blood and falls down, dead. Mendez suspects this has happened since she failed to find a victim.

The horde then breaks into the radio station, attacking the sound booth. Sydney draws the mob outside with a looped recording of Grant's voice saying 'Sydney Briar is alive". When he fears that he is about to succumb to the virus, Dr. Mendez begins to speak in Armenian upon realizing that the virus is exclusive to the English language, which prevents the virus from taking over. When the recording fails, the mob returns but Mendez lures them away, saving Sydney and Grant, who now lock themselves in the equipment room.

While Grant tries to figure out how to reverse the symptom, Sydney begins to succumb to the word "kill". Grant convinces her that the word "kill" now means "kiss" and her symptoms subside. Hoping to stop the virus, the pair go on the air, spouting a series of self-contradicting and confusing phrases to help their infected listeners, ignoring warnings from the authorities who are trying to get them off the air. While an amplified voice from outside counts down from ten, Sydney joins Grant in the booth and they kiss. An explosion can be heard when the film cuts to black.

Over the black, news reports of further outbreaks of the virus suggest that the quarantine failed, spread by the news itself and eventually reaching England, the source of its targeted language. In a post-credits scene, Sydney and Grant (now known as "Lisa" and "Johnny Deadeyes") survive the virus and continue speaking English by maintaining a system of improvisational roleplay as the screen shifts from black and white to color.

Alternative ending (radio play)
Whilst the radio play version of the story changes a few features, such as the more visual elements being restyled for audio or removed all together; it also features an alternative ending. In this ending when Grant convinces Sydney that "kill" now means "kiss" she asks Grant to "kiss" her (in the film version she says "kill" leading to them kissing).

Soon after when broadcasting his own obituaries of Laurel-Ann and Mendez (who Grant assumes will meet his demise eventually), he confirms the death of Sydney, implying that he "kissed" her at her request.
Grant, now completely alone, realises that he has become infected through the word "paper". Resigned to his fate, he allows himself to be taken by the word, repeating it over and over again, before finally uttering one different word: "trap".

Cast

Production
Pontypool is based on Tony Burgess' novel Pontypool Changes Everything. Burgess adapted the material for the screen himself. According to McDonald, the writer hashed out a script in 48 hours. Orson Welles' infamous radio broadcast of The War of the Worlds inspired the approach that they decided to take.  It was simultaneously produced as a motion picture and a radio play.

Filming took place in Toronto, Ontario, rather than in Pontypool itself.

At Rue Morgues 2008 Festival of Fear expo, director Bruce McDonald stressed the victims of the virus detailed in the film were not zombies and called them "conversationalists". He described the stages of the disease:There are three stages to this virus. The first stage is you might begin to repeat a word. Something gets stuck. And usually it's words that are terms of endearment like sweetheart or honey. The second stage is your language becomes scrambled and you can't express yourself properly. The third stage you become so distraught at your condition that the only way out of the situation you feel, as an infected person, is to try and chew your way through the mouth of another person.

According to McDonald, the final scene of Grant and Sydney, now presented in a kicker, was originally placed before the credits. However, audiences in early screenings found the original ending to be too confusing, so the scene was moved behind the credits instead.

Release
Rue Morgue and ChiZine Publications held a special screening of Pontypool on 3 December 2009 at the Toronto Underground Cinema and following the screening, it featured a Q&A with Stephen McHattie, Lisa Houle, and Tony Burgess.

The film was released theatrically in Canada on March 6, 2009. The film was released on DVD and Blu-ray on 25 January 2010.

Reception
Pontypool received generally positive reviews from critics, currently holding an 84% rating on Rotten Tomatoes based on 86 reviews; the consensus states: "Witty and restrained but still taut and funny, this Pontypool is a different breed of low-budget zombie film." On Metacritic, which uses an average of critics' reviews, the film has a rating of 54/100, indicating "mixed or average reviews".

In 2018, Consequence of Sound ranked Pontypool the 42nd "Scariest Movie Ever Made".

Accolades
 30th Genie Awards - Best Actor, Best Director, Best Adapted Screenplay (Nominated)

Follow-ups
, a direct sequel, Pontypool Changes, has been repeatedly teased (2009 for 2010 release, 2012 for 2013 release, and 2018 for 2019 release) as supposedly being in active development over the previous 13 years.

In May 2009, Pontypool Changes was confirmed to be in development, with McDonald returning as director for production in 2010. In July 2012, a teaser poster for the film was released at the Fantasia Film Festival, with an intended release date of 2013. In April 2018, McDonald and Burgess revealed that their film Dreamland, which ultimately saw release in 2019, would be a spin-off of Pontypool serving as "a sequel to the [film's] post-credit non-sequitur scene, with McHattie and Houle" reprising their roles. Burgess additionally confirmed that Pontypool Changes, also known as Typo Chan, would follow the English language virus passing into the written word, would feature McHattie and Houle reprising their roles, and would go into production by 2019.

References

External links

 
 
 
 
 

2008 films
2008 horror films
2008 science fiction films
2000s thriller films
Canadian psychological horror films
2000s mystery horror films
Canadian science fiction horror films
Canadian horror thriller films
English-language Canadian films
Films directed by Bruce McDonald
Films based on Canadian novels
Films set in Ontario
Films shot in Toronto
Canadian independent films
2000s science fiction horror films
2000s monster movies
Films about viral outbreaks
French-language Canadian films
2000s Canadian films